Kaylee Anne DeFer (born September 23, 1986) is a former American actress. She was known for her portrayals of Hillary Gold in The War at Home, and of Ivy Dickens in Gossip Girl.

Early life
DeFer was born in Tucson, Arizona. In 2003, she moved to Los Angeles to pursue a career in acting.

Career
DeFer made her acting debut in a March 2004 episode of the Nickelodeon sitcom Drake & Josh. She has since made a number of guest appearances on television shows such as Quintuplets, Ghost Whisperer, CSI: Miami, and How I Met Your Mother. DeFer appears on the cover of Reeve Oliver's second album, Touchtone Inferno (2007).

In May 2004, DeFer was cast as Scarlett on The WB's drama series The Mountain. The series follows the personal lives of the staff and friends at a remote ski resort. The series premiered on September 22, 2004, but was cancelled after four months.

In April 2005, DeFer landed a role on the Fox sitcom The War at Home. The series centers on the day-to-day life of Gold family whom reside in Long Island, New York. DeFer portrayed teenager Hillary Gold, the eldest child who frequently misbehaves. The series premiered on September 11, 2005, to 7.2 million viewers, but received generally negative reviews from critics. The series ran for two seasons.

DeFer starred in her theatrical film debut Flicka, released in October 2006. DeFer portrayed the film's antagonist, Miranda Koop. In 2011, DeFer starred in the low-budget Western film Mattie, which was released on DVD under the title Renegade.

In April 2011, The CW announced DeFer would have a major recurring arc in both the fourth and fifth seasons of Gossip Girl. DeFer had previously auditioned for the role of Raina Thorpe, but she did not receive the part. DeFer portrayed the role of Ivy Dickens, a con artist who pretends to be Charlotte "Charlie" Rhodes in order to get access to the latter's trust fund. DeFer was reunited with The Mountain castmate Penn Badgley. She reprised her role of Ivy in the series' sixth and final season and was listed as a main cast member. In May 2013, DeFer announced plans to take a break from acting after the birth of her first son.

Personal life
In January 2012, DeFer called off her engagement to jewelry designer Michael Raymond Pereira, whom she had been dating on and off since 2002.

DeFer subsequently began dating Michael Fitzpatrick, lead vocalist for the band Fitz and the Tantrums, and in May 2013, she announced that they were expecting a child together. Their first son was born on September 20, 2013. The couple got married on July 25, 2015. On April 11, 2017, they welcomed their second son, followed by their third son on May 26, 2019.

Filmography

Film

Television

References

External links

 

1986 births
21st-century American actresses
Actresses from Tucson, Arizona
American child actresses
American film actresses
American television actresses
Living people